Keith Williams  (born 21 April 1958) is a British architect and founder of London based Keith Williams Architects.

Education and career

Williams was educated at Kingston Grammar School before going on to study architecture at Kingston and then Greenwich Schools of Architecture.

In 1984, he qualified as an architect and worked for Sheppard Robson then Farrells, before co-founding Pawson Williams Architects in 1987. In 2001, he founded Keith Williams Architects.

Williams became a fellow of the Royal Society of Arts in 2007, and a member of the National Design Review Panel for CABE in 2009. In 2011, he joined the National Awards Panel of the Civic Trust becoming chair in 2015. In 2016 he became a Fellow of the Royal Institute of British Architects.

Buildings

 2012, The Novium, Chichester

 2011, Marlowe Theatre, Canterbury
 2012, Luan Gallery, Athlone
 2008, Wexford Opera House

 2005, Unicorn Theatre, London

Books

2009, Keith Williams: Architecture of the Specific, Image Publishing, Mulgrave.

Prizes
2017 RIAI Triennial Gold Medal - shortlisted
2014 Civic Trust Award for the Luan Gallery, Athlone, RIBA National Award for the Novium Museum Chichester
2013 Civic Trust Award and Civic Trust Michael Middleton Special Award both for the Novium Museum Chichester, Civic Trust Award for the Marlowe Theatre, Canterbury, RIAI Best Cultural Building Award
2012 RIBA Downland Award
2010 AIA Award, Quadrennial Award for Practical Design Excellence, Soc. of Theatre Consultants, LAMA NAtional Impact Award
2009 RIBA Award, RIAI Award: Best Cultural Building for Wexford Opera House
2008 RIBA Award, BD Public Building Architect of the Year Award, Chicago Athenaeum Prize, OPUS Architecture & Construction Award, Copper in Architecture Award
2007 RIAI Award, USITT Award
2006 RIBA Award, RIAI Award, BD Public Building Architect of the Year Award, Chicago Athenaeum Prize
2005 RIBA European Award, RIAI Award: Best Sustainable Building Award, OPUS Architecture & Construction Award, Irish Concrete Society Award
2004 Richmond Society Award: Gold Medallion

References

External links
 Official website

1958 births
Living people
Architects from London
People educated at Kingston Grammar School